Deven Johanna Owsiany (born June 29, 1989) is an American rugby union player. She was named in the Eagles 2017 Women's Rugby World Cup squad. She made her sevens debut for the United States at the 2012 USA Sevens in Las Vegas.

She was honored at the Women’s Sports Foundation’s 32nd Annual Salute to Athletes in 2011. She played at the 2013 Rugby World Cup Sevens in Moscow, Russia.

References

External links
 Deven Owsiany at USA Rugby
 

1989 births
Living people
American female rugby union players
United States women's international rugby union players
Pennsylvania State University alumni
21st-century American women
American female rugby sevens players